Didier Boubé (born 13 February 1957) is a French former modern pentathlete. He competed at the 1984 Summer Olympics, winning a bronze medal in the team event, and 10th place in the individual event.

References

People from Vichy
1957 births
Living people
French male modern pentathletes
Olympic modern pentathletes of France
Modern pentathletes at the 1984 Summer Olympics
Olympic bronze medalists for France
Olympic medalists in modern pentathlon
Medalists at the 1984 Summer Olympics
Sportspeople from Allier
20th-century French people